Salvador, officially the Municipality of Salvador (Maranao: Inged a Salvador;), is a 5th class municipality in the province of Lanao del Norte, Philippines. According to the 2020 census, it has a population of 32,115 people.

History
Salvador was created from Baroy through Executive Order No. 370 signed by President Carlos P. Garcia on January 13, 1960.

Geography

Barangays
Salvador is politically subdivided into 25 barangays.

Climate

Demographics
History

Founded on January 13, 1960 when the then Provincial Governor Salvador Lluch sponsored a resolution for the creation of a new municipality out of Baroy, Lanao del Norte.

Economy

References

External links
 Salvador Profile at the DTI Cities and Municipalities Competitive Index
 [ Philippine Standard Geographic Code]
 Philippine Census Information
 Local Governance Performance Management System

Municipalities of Lanao del Norte
Establishments by Philippine executive order